Homans is a surname. Notable people with the surname include:

Benjamin Homans (d. 1823), American merchant captain
Bill Homans (b. 1949), American blues musician known as "Watermelon Slim"
George C. Homans (1910–1989), American Sociologist
Helen Homans (1878–1949), American tennis champion
James Edward Homans (1865–1949), American author, editor and publisher
Jennifer Homans (b. 1960), American academic and author
John Homans (1877–1954), American surgeon who described Homans' sign and Homans' operation.
Liesbeth Homans (b. 1973), Belgian politician 
Robert Homans (1877–1947), American actor
Sheppard Homans, Jr. (1871–1952), All-American football player and insurance executive

See also
Homan (surname)